Sollima is a surname originating in Italy. Notable people with the surname include:

 Eliodoro Sollima (1926–2000), Italian composer and pianist
 Giovanni Sollima (born 1962), Italian composer and cellist
 Sergio Sollima (1921–2015), Italian director and playwright
 Stefano Sollima (born 1966), Italian director and screenwriter

Italian-language surnames